Paulianolebia rubicunda is a species of beetle in the family Carabidae, the only species in the genus Paulianolebia.

References

Lebiinae